Flemish stew, known in Dutch as stoofvlees or stoverij and in French as carbon(n)ade à la flamande is a Flemish beef (or pork) and onion stew popular in Belgium, the Netherlands and French Flanders, made with beer and mustard spread on bread, seasoning can include bay leaf, thyme, clove and juniper berries.

In French, a carbon(n)ade may also be a dish of grilled horse loin and certain beef stews cooked with red wine such as beef bourguignon in the east of France. but in English, carbonnade is generally the Belgian dish. The term Flemish stew, being a generic term, is sometimes used to refer to other Flemish dishes such as waterzooi or hochepot.

As a staple of Belgian cuisine, recipes vary between regions and households. Variations include swapping bread for gingerbread or speculaas, using extra condiments, like Sirop de Liège, and using different kinds of beer. Common beers for this dish include Oud bruin (Old Brown Beer), Brune Abbey beer and Flanders red. Just before serving, a small amount of cider or wine vinegar and either brown sugar or red currant jelly are sometimes added.

Carbonade is often accompanied by French fries, boiled potatoes or stoemp. It is widely available in restaurants and friteries in Belgium and the Netherlands.

See also
 List of stews

References

Belgian stews
French cuisine
Beer dishes
Dutch cuisine
Belgian cuisine